Caledonia County Airport  is a state-owned public-use airport located three nautical miles (6 km) north of the central business district of Lyndonville, a village in Caledonia County, Vermont, United States. It is also known as Caledonia County State Airport.

Although most U.S. airports use the same three-letter location identifier for the FAA and IATA, this airport is assigned CDA by the FAA and LLX by the IATA (which assigned CDA to Cooinda, Northern Territory, Australia).

Facilities and aircraft 
It has one asphalt paved runway designated 2/20 which measures 3,300 by 60 feet (1,006 x 18 m).

For the 12-month period ending December 12, 2007, the airport had 4,690 aircraft operations, an average of 12 per day: 97% general aviation, 2% air taxi and 1% military. At that time there were 18 aircraft based at this airport, all single-engine.

References

External links 
 

Airports in Vermont
Transportation buildings and structures in Caledonia County, Vermont